Steven John Bailey (born February 12, 1942, in Bronx, New York) is a former professional baseball pitcher. He played for the Cleveland Indians from 1967 to 1968.

Baseball career
During 1966, Bailey played for the Cleveland Indians-affiliated Pawtucket Indians. After playing with the Cleveland Indians during 1967, he was demoted mid-season to the Portland Beavers.

References

External links
, or Retrosheet
Mexican Baseball League statistics
Venezuelan Professional Baseball League statistics

1942 births
Living people
Algodoneros de Unión Laguna players
American expatriate baseball players in Mexico
Cardenales de Lara players
American expatriate baseball players in Venezuela
Charleston Indians players
Cleveland Indians players
Dubuque Packers players
Estrellas Orientales (VPBL) players
Major League Baseball pitchers
Mexican League baseball pitchers
Oklahoma City 89ers players
Pawtucket Indians players
Portland Beavers players
Reading Indians players
Sportspeople from the Bronx
Baseball players from New York City
Tulsa Oilers (baseball) players